Wedding Bells is a 1954 West German drama film directed by Georg Wildhagen and starring Marianne Hold, Renate Mannhardt, and Jan Hendriks. It was shot at the Bendestorf Studios near Hamburg and on location around Starnberg, Feldafing and the Ammersee in Bavaria. The film's sets were designed by the art director Robert Herlth.

Cast

References

Bibliography

External links 
 

1954 films
1954 drama films
German drama films
West German films
1950s German-language films
Films directed by Georg Wildhagen
German black-and-white films
1950s German films
Films shot in Bavaria